The Orca is an autonomous underwater vehicle (AUV) that is under development by Boeing and Huntington Ingalls Industries (HII) for the United States Navy.

The Orca dates back to September 2017, when the Navy issued contracts worth about US$40 million each to Boeing, which had partnered earlier in the year with HII to build unmanned submarines, and Lockheed Martin to develop competing designs for an extra-large unmanned undersea vehicle (XLUUV) capable of autonomous operation on missions up to several months in duration.  In February 2019, the Navy awarded the Boeing/HII consortium a $43 million contract to begin work on building four of their XLUUVs, the design of which would be based on Boeing's earlier AUV Echo Voyager.  The following month, the Navy added a fifth vehicle to the order, with the total value of the contract reaching $274.4 million.  Orca deliveries were planned to be completed by the end of 2022.  

The Navy specified the ability to adapt the Orca platform according to mission, with the ability for surveillance, submerged, surface, and electronic combat, and minesweeping. The vessel will be powered by a hybrid diesel/lithium-ion battery system, which powers the Orca by battery while submerged and recharges the batteries with diesel generators while surfaced.

See also
HSU-001

Notes

References

Robotic submarines
Proposed ships of the United States Navy